Conrad Philip Havord (13 April 1925 – 13 January 2016), known professionally as Conrad Phillips, was an English television and film actor. He is best known for playing William Tell in the adventure series The Adventures of William Tell (1958–1959).

Life and career
Phillips was born Conrad Philip Havord in London, the son of Horace Havord, who was a journalist and a writer of detective stories. Conrad attended St John's Bowyer School, Clapham, in South London, then worked for an insurance company. 

Phillips altered his date of birth on his ration book so that he could join the Royal Navy at the age of 17. In his three years of service during the Second World War he saw action in the Atlantic Ocean, the Mediterranean Sea and the North Sea, and survived the mining of a landing craft. 

Phillips called himself Bill in the Navy because his shipmates kept ridiculing the name Conrad. He did not adopt the name Conrad Phillips until he started acting. His father had used the name for some of the thrillers he wrote and suggested that his son use it as his stage name. In his autobiography, Aiming True, Conrad wrote that he regretted doing so.

Phillips studied at RADA, and then appeared in repertory theatre and in the West End. He is probably best known for portraying William Tell in the popular ITV television series The Adventures of William Tell, which ran for 39 episodes from 1958 to 1959. He was in a wheelchair during the filming of the last episode of the series because he had broken his ankle on location.. He spent the last episode of The Adventures of William Tell in a wheelchair, because he had broken his ankle whilst on location. Even the fighting shots were done in this way. He also played Tell's mentor Stefan in Crossbow in 1987. Severe back pain, two replacement knees and a replacement hip brought an end to his career, and he retired in 1991. 

Phillips met his second wife, Jennie, in April 1968. In January 1972 they set about restoring a Scottish hill farm called Skeoch. 
They eventually went to live in Chippenham, Wiltshire. Phillips published his autobiography, Aiming True, in 2013.

Other TV appearances
 The Adventures of the Scarlet Pimpernel (1956) episode 17 – Gentlemen of the Road. Character – Latour.
 The Invisible Man – Series 2, Episode 12 – Shadow Bomb (1961). Character – Captain Finch.
 Richard the Lionheart (1961–62 TV series) – episode 21 – A Marriage of Convenience (1962). Character – Guy.
 The Avengers (1966) episode – Silent Dust. Character – Mellors.
 Callan (1967) episode – Jack on Top. Character – Wilson.
 The Prisoner (1967) episode – "The General"
 UFO (1971) episode – Reflections in the Water. Character – Skipper.
 Fawlty Towers (1975) episode – The Wedding Party. Character – Mr Lloyd
 Cribb (1980) episode – Mad Hatter's Holiday. Character – Dr. Prothero
 The Return of Sherlock Holmes (1985) episode – The Abbey Grange. Character – Sir Eustace Brackenstall
 Hannay (1989) episode - Double Jeopardy. Character – Dirk Huysman.
Other TV shows: The Count of Monte Cristo, The New Adventures of Charlie Chan, The Newcomers (recurring character – Robert Malcolm), Sutherland's Law, Howards' Way, Never the Twain, The Gaffer, Sorry! and Emmerdale Farm (recurring character – Dr Christopher Meadows from 1981 to 1986). Mini-series: Into the Labyrinth and The Master of Ballantrae.

Selected filmography

 A Song for Tomorrow (1948) – Lieutenant Fenton
 The Temptress (1949) – Captain Green
 Lilli Marlene (1950) – Security Officer
 The Last Page (1952) – Detective Todd (uncredited)
 It Started in Paradise (1952) – 1st Photographer (uncredited)
 Three Steps to the Gallows (1953) – Clerk – Travel Agent (uncredited)
 Mantrap (1953) – Barker
 The Diamond (1954) – Policeman (uncredited)
 Johnny on the Spot (1954) – Police Sergeant (uncredited)
 The Secret Tent (1956) – Detective Sergeant
 The Last Man to Hang (1956) – Dr. Mason
 Circus Friends (1956) – Larry
 The Battle of the River Plate (1956) – Lt. Washbourne – Gunnery Officer, HMS Achilles (uncredited)
 Zarak (1956) – Johnson – Young Officer
 A Question of Adultery (1958) – Mario
 The White Trap (1959) – Sgt. Morrison
 Witness in the Dark (1959) – Inspector Coates
 The Desperate Man (1959) – Curtis
 Circus of Horrors (1960) – Insp. Arthur Ames
 Sons and Lovers (1960) – Baxter Dawes
 The Fourth Square (1961) – Bill Lawrence
 No Love for Johnnie (1961) – Drake
 The Secret Partner (1961) – Dr. Alan Richford
 Shadow of the Cat (1961) – Michael Latimer
 Murder, She Said (1961) – Harold
 A Guy Called Caesar (1962) – Tony
 The Durant Affair (1962) – Julian Armour
 Dead Man's Evidence (1962) – David Baxter
 Don't Talk to Strange Men (1962) – Ron
 Impact (1963) – Jack Moir
 The Switch (1963) – John Curry
 Heavens Above! (1963) – P.R.O.
 Stopover Forever (1964) – Eric Cunningham
 Dateline Diamonds (1965) – Tom Jenkins
 The Murder Game (1965) – Peter Shanley
 Who Killed the Cat? (1966) – Inspector Bruton
 The Ghost of Monk's Island (1967) – Eli Oakes.

References

External links

Aiming True – The Autobiography of Conrad Phillips
Screen Heaven: William Tell
Screenonline: William Tell
Dateline Diamonds
Skeoch – Our New Life On A Scottish Hill Farm

English male television actors
1925 births
2016 deaths
English male stage actors
English male film actors
Male actors from London
20th-century English male actors
21st-century English male actors
Alumni of RADA
Royal Navy personnel of World War II
21st-century English male writers
English autobiographers